The Moab 240 is an annual  ultramarathon in Utah.

Course 
The  race begins and ends in Moab, Utah, after which it is named, following the trail of the Colorado River. The course has  of ascent, and covers desert basins as well parts of the Abajo and La Sal mountains. The course time limit is 113 hours.

History 
Founded in 2017, the Moab 240 was created in honor of distance runner Stephen Jones.

Results 

* Overall winner

References

External links

 Official website

Biennial athletics competitions
Ultramarathons in the United States
Sports competitions in Utah